Oppegaard Spur is a narrow rock spur, 2 nautical miles (3.7 km) long, extending northwest from the southwest portion of Mount Speed, standing just east of Kosco Glacier where the latter enters Ross Ice Shelf. Discovered and photographed by the United States Antarctic Service (USAS), 1939–41. Named by Advisory Committee on Antarctic Names (US-ACAN) for Richard D. Oppegaard, Seaman Apprentice, U.S. Navy, a member of the U.S. Naval Support Force, Antarctica, who died in a shipboard accident, November 8, 1957.

Ridges of Antarctica
Dufek Coast